Pleurothallis cajamarcae is a species of orchid endemic to Peru. It was named in 1921.

References

cajamarcae
Flora of Peru